Oleg Adolfovich Yeryomin (born 28 October 1967) is a former Russian football player.

Club career
He made his Russian Premier League debut for FC Zenit Saint Petersburg on 2 March 1996 in a game against FC KAMAZ-Chally Naberezhnye Chelny. He also played one game in the top tier for FC Lokomotiv Moscow in 1997.

External links
 

1967 births
Footballers from Ufa
Living people
Soviet footballers
Russian footballers
FC Zenit Saint Petersburg players
FC Chernomorets Novorossiysk players
FC Tekstilshchik Kamyshin players
FC Lokomotiv Moscow players
Russian Premier League players
Pohang Steelers players
Russian expatriate footballers
Expatriate footballers in South Korea
Chongqing Liangjiang Athletic F.C. players
Expatriate footballers in China
FC Lokomotiv Nizhny Novgorod players
FC Arsenal Tula players
Association football forwards
FC Dynamo Saint Petersburg players
FC Neftyanik Ufa players
FC Spartak-UGP Anapa players
FC Zenit-2 Saint Petersburg players